The Unirea is a right tributary of the river Mureș in Transylvania, Romania. It discharges into the Mureș in the village Unirea.

References

Rivers of Romania
Rivers of Alba County
Rivers of Cluj County